Durrant Brown (born 8 July 1964) is a retired Jamaican football player.

The defender played his entire career for Wadadah F.C. He was nicknamed "Tatty". He played as a central defender despite being only 1.71m.

He played 102 times for the Jamaica national football team and was a participant at the 1998 FIFA World Cup.

Honours
Jamaica National Premier League: 2
 1988, 1992
Caribbean Cup: 1
 1991

See also 
 List of men's footballers with 100 or more international caps

References

1964 births
Jamaican footballers
1993 CONCACAF Gold Cup players
1998 CONCACAF Gold Cup players
1998 FIFA World Cup players
Living people
FIFA Century Club
Jamaica international footballers
Wadadah F.C. players
Association football defenders
People from Montego Bay